Alias Pink Puzz is an album by Paul Revere and the Raiders released in 1969.

Background
The title was a humorous reference to the band's tactic of sending the new record to a Los Angeles FM radio station under a pseudonym. It was broadcast as long as the station did not know that "Pink Puzz" was Paul Revere and the Raiders. This album was slanted towards folk rock more than other albums released by this group.  Songs such as "Thank You", "Down in Amsterdam", "Original Handyman" and "Louisiana Redbone" led the way towards the folk rock theme. "Freeborn Man" became a bluegrass staple for Jimmy Martin in 1969, and was later covered in 1976 by the Southern rock band Outlaws.

During this time period the group hosted a television program named It’s Happening. Later the show was renamed Happening '68, and then at the turn of the year to 'Happening 69. Because of the success of the single "Let Me", which was a hard rock song, and the album Alias Pink Puzz, the group did a European tour with The Beach Boys in the summer. "Let Me" and Alias Pink Puzz were released after the European tour.

A single from this album, "Let Me", made the AM radio Top 40. Alias Pink Puzz charted higher than any Raiders album during the previous two years but retained that position for fewer weeks than any other Raiders album since 1965.  The album reached No. 48 on Billboard in the United States and No. 46 in Canada. Originally released on Columbia records on vinyl, the album was re-released on CD by Sundazed and again later on Raven.

The Raiders were one of the many rock groups invited to the Woodstock concert but they turned down the invitation.

Track listing

Side 1
"Let Me!" (Lindsay) – 3:59
 "Thank You" (Lindsay) – 3:01
 "Frankfort Side Street" (Lindsay) – 3:02
 "Hey Babro" (Lindsay) – 2:31
 "Louisiana Redbone" (Allison, Lindsay) – 2:12
 "Here Comes The Pain" (Allison, Lindsay)  – 3:14

Side 2
 "The Original Handy Man" (Lindsay) – 2:28
 "I Need You" (Allison, Lindsay) –  2:02
 "Down In Amsterdam" (Allison, Lindsay) – 3:58
  "I Don't Know" (Lindsay) – 5:31
 "Freeborn Man" (Allison, Lindsay) – 3:35

References

External links 
 Official Paul Revere and the Raiders; featuring Mark Lindsay website
 Cash Box Singles: 1969
 Music Archive website: Paul Revere The Raiders - Alias Pink Puzz(1969)

1969 albums
Columbia Records albums
Paul Revere & the Raiders albums